Edward Hungerford may refer to:
Edward Hungerford (died 1572) (1519–1572), English MP for Great Bedwyn
Sir Edward Hungerford (died 1522), English soldier, courtier, and a sheriff for Wiltshire, Somerset and Dorset
Edward Hungerford (died 1607), English MP for Wiltshire
Sir Edward Hungerford (Roundhead) (1596–1648), supported Parliament during the English Civil War
Sir Edward Hungerford (spendthrift) (1632–1711), member of Parliament and founder of Hungerford Market, Charing Cross
Edward Hungerford (author) (1875–1948), American writer
J. Edward Hungerford (1883–1964), American silent film screenwriter